General elections were held in Qatar for the first time on 2 October 2021, following an announcement by the Emir of Qatar on 22 August 2021. The elections for the Consultative Assembly were originally scheduled to be held in the second half of 2013, but were postponed in June 2013 until at least 2016. In 2016 they were postponed again. Finally, in November 2020, Emir Tamim bin Hamad Al Thani pledged to hold the election in October 2021.

Background
The elections were originally scheduled to be held in the last six months of 2013, but were postponed prior to the retiring Emir Hamad bin Khalifa Al Thani transferring power to his son Tamim bin Hamad Al Thani. The Consultative Assembly's term was extended until 2016 and then until 2019.

In October 2019 Al Thani issued an order for a committee to be formed to organise the elections, chaired by Prime Minister Khalid bin Khalifa bin Abdul Aziz Al Thani.

Electoral system
Men and women aged over 18 are eligible to vote for 30 of the 45 seats in the Consultative Assembly according to the constitution, with the remainder appointed by the Emir.

On 29 July 2021, Al Thani approved the electoral law, which mandated the thirty members being elected from single-member constituencies by first-past-the-post voting. The law requires candidates to be at least thirty years old and 'of Qatari origin' (as defined by the 2005 nationality law). This limited voting to those descended from people who held citizenship in 1930, barring people who had been naturalised and members of the Al Murrah tribe from contesting the election and leading to protests.

Campaign
A total of 284 candidates contested the 30 seats, with 29 women running. Political parties are banned and all candidates ran as independents.

Preliminary results
No women were elected. Voter turnout was 63.5%. According to Human Rights Watch, thousands of Qataris were excluded from voting.

References

External links
Shura Council Election Supervisory Committee

Elections in Qatar
Qatar
General
Non-partisan elections
Election and referendum articles with incomplete results